Syed Shahid Hakim (23 June 1939 – 22 August 2021) was an Indian footballer, manager and FIFA official & Football Referee. Hakim also acted as assistant manager of India national team during the 1980s. He was awarded by the prestigious Dhyan Chand Award in 2017 for his contributions to the sport.

Playing career
Hakim was the member of the last India national football team played in the 1960 Rome Olympics. He served as the Regional Director of Sports Authority of India. He played in the position of half-back. Hakim was an international referee with FIFA badge holder.

In club football, Hakim appeared with Hyderabad City Police FC, then one of the strongest sides in Indian football.

Post-playing career
After retiring from football, Hakim became FIFA badge holder international referee, and officiated matches of Asian Club Championship, and the 1988 AFC Asian Cup in Qatar.

He was also worked as pilot, having served as Squadron Leader of the Indian Air Force. Hakim later appointed regional director of Sports Authority of India (SAI). He also went on to serve as "project director in charge of scouting" before the beginning of 2017 FIFA U-17 World Cup in India.

Managerial career
He managed National Football League (India) outfit Mahindra United from 1998 to 1999, and guided the team clinching 1998 Durand Cup. He later managed another NFL side Salgaocar, before becoming head coach of NFL second division and Bombay Harwood League club Bengal Mumbai in 2004–05.

Beside managing Indian clubs, he also served as assistant coach of P. K. Banerjee managed India national football team at the 1982 Asian Games in New Delhi.

Hakim for his contributions to Indian football as coach and manager, was conferred with the prestigious Dronacharya Award in 2017.

Personal life
Born in Hyderabad, British India, Hakim is son of legendary football coach Syed Abdul Rahim, whose tenure as coach of India national team is regarded as "golden age" of football in the country.

Hakim was tested positive for COVID-19 but recovered after treatment. He died on 22 August 2021 of cardiac arrest, aged 82, at a hospital in Gulbarga.

Awards and honours

Player
Hyderabad City Police
Durand Cup: 1961
Rovers Cup: 1960, 1962
Sait Nagjee Trophy: 1958
DCM Trophy: 1959

Hyderabad
Santosh Trophy: 1957–58

Individual
 Dhyan Chand Award in 2017.

Manager
Mahindra United
 Durand Cup: 1998

Individual
 Dronacharya Award: 2017

References

Bibliography

External links
 
 Syed Shahid Hakim – Doordarshan Sports on Facebook

1939 births
2021 deaths
Indian football referees
Indian footballers
India international footballers
Footballers at the 1960 Summer Olympics
Olympic footballers of India
Association football forwards
AFC Asian Cup referees
Recipients of the Dhyan Chand Award
Footballers from Hyderabad, India
Indian football managers